The 2011 Soweto Open was a professional tennis tournament played on hard courts. It was the third edition of the tournament which is part of the 2011 ATP Challenger Tour. It took place in Johannesburg, South Africa between 11 and 17 April 2011. All women's doubles semifinal matches had been cancelled by the supervisor, due to heavy rain and flooding.

ATP singles main-draw entrants

Seeds

 Rankings are as of April 4, 2011.

Other entrants
The following players received wildcards into the singles main draw:
  Warren Kuhn
  Renier Moolman
  Ruan Roelofse
  Nikala Scholtz

The following players received entry from the qualifying draw:
  Chris Eaton
  Toshihide Matsui
  Denys Molchanov
  Stanislav Vovk

WTA main draw singles entrants

Seeds

 Rankings are as of April 4, 2011.

Other entrants
The following players received wildcards into the singles main draw:
  Natasha Fourouclas
  Lynn Kiro
  Zarah Razafimahatratra
  Madrie Le Roux

The following players received entry from the qualifying draw:
  Gally de Wael
  Kim Grajdek
  Teodora Mirčić
  Asia Muhammad

Champions

Singles

 Izak van der Merwe def.  Rik de Voest, 6–7(2), 7–5, 6–3

 Valeria Savinykh def.  Petra Cetkovská, 6–1, 6–3

Doubles

 Michael Kohlmann /  Alexander Peya def.  Andre Begemann /  Matthew Ebden 6–2, 6–2

Cancelled due to heavy rain and flooding

References

External links
Official Website
ITF Search
ATP official site

Soweto Open
Soweto Open
Sow
Soweto Open
Soweto Open